is a 2012 Japanese historical-drama film directed by Shinji Higuchi and Isshin Inudo, starring Mansai Nomura, and adapts Ryō Wada's novel (2007) of the same name.

Set in feudal Japan, the film is based on the Siege of Oshi and depicts the struggle of Oshi's villagers in defending their fortress against Toyotomi Hideyoshi's campaign against the Hojo clan. Against insurmountable odds, Narita Nagachika, the fortress's castellan, leads a group of 500 men against 20,000 men led by Ishida Mitsunari, part of Toyotomi clan's greater army of 20,000 samurai.

Cast
 Mansai Nomura as Nagachika Narita 
 Nana Eikura as Kaihime
 Hiroki Narimiya as Sakamaki
 Tomomitsu Yamaguchi as Izumi
 Kōichi Satō as Tanba 
 Masachika Ichimura as Hideyoshi Toyotomi
 Takehiro Hira as Masaie Natsuka
 Takayuki Yamada as Yoshitsugu Otani
 Yusuke Kamiji as Mitsunari Ishida
 Masahiko Nishimura as Ujinaga Narita 
 Sei Hiraizumi as Yasusue Narita 
 Isao Natsuyagi as Monk 
 Takeo Nakahara as Hojo Ujimasa
 Honami Suzuki as Tama
 Gin Maeda as Tahee 
 Akiyoshi Nakao as Kazou
 Machiko Ono as Chiyo 
 Mana Ashida as Chidori

Production
The film was produced by the following studios.

Asahi Shimbun
Asatsu-DK
Asmik Ace Entertainment
Broadcasting System of Niigata
C&I Entertainment
Chubu-Nippon Broadcasting
Chugoku Broadcasting
Cybird Holdings
East Japan Marketing & Communications
Hakuhodo DY Media Partners
Happinet
Hokkaido Broadcasting
Kou Shibusawa Production
Mainichi Broadcasting System
Nippon Shuppan Hanbai
RKB Mainichi Broadcasting
Shizuoka Broadcasting System
Shogakukan
Tokyo Broadcasting System
TBS Radio & Communications
Television Saitama (JAITS)
UHF Television Yamanashi
Toho
Tohoku Broadcasting Company
Tokyo FM
Tsutaya Group
WOWOW
Yahoo! Japan

Reception
Mark Adams of Screen International gave the film a favorable review, describing the film as an "epic period action-comedy packed with wonderfully over-the-top characters, great production values and some spectacular sequences".

Awards
The film racked up ten nominations for the Japan Academy Prize, winning one for Best Art Direction. Additionally it was nominated for three Asian Film Awards.

References

External links
 
 

2012 films
2010s Japanese-language films
2010s historical drama films
Films set in Japan
Films set in the 1590s
Japanese historical drama films
Films directed by Shinji Higuchi
Films directed by Isshin Inudo
Toho films
Cultural depictions of Toyotomi Hideyoshi
2012 drama films
2010s Japanese films